Ferris Bolton (February 13, 1853 – May 11, 1937) was a politician and farmer. He was elected to the House of Commons of Canada as a Member of the Unionist Party in the 1917 election to represent the riding of Lisgar. Prior to his federal political experience, he was reeve of South Dufferin and Pemble, Manitoba between 1880 and 1894 and reeve of Pembina, Manitoba between 1891 and 1894. Bolton was also Postmaster of Calf Mountain from 1881 to 1900, and postmaster at Darlingford from 1913 to 1917.

He married Jennie Stewart on December 22, 1880 with whom he had five sons, three of whom were killed in World War I, and two daughters. He was the son of John F. and May "Hannah" Bolton.

References
 Manitoba Historical Society

External links
 

1853 births
1937 deaths
Members of the House of Commons of Canada from Manitoba
Unionist Party (Canada) MPs
Mayors of places in Manitoba
Canadian postmasters